Rammstein Tour 2016 is the unofficial name for Rammstein's first concert tour after a three-year hiatus. It was the series of concerts played by the band on summer festivals (mostly in Europe, but also in North and South America). The only exception were concerts played in Berlin, because these concerts were not part of any festival. Rammstein were also one of the headliners of Southside Festival, but their performance fell through after the cancellation of the two final days of the festival.

History 
In November 2015 Rammstein announced they would headline a range of international festivals in summer 2016. More shows were gradually confirmed at the beginning of 2016. The show in Wrocław was exceptionally announced by organizers. In April 2016 they announced two shows in Berlin, but due to the immense demand the band confirmed an additional show in Berlin. In May 2016 Rammstein confirmed their shows in South America.

Before the tour started Rammstein played four rehearsal shows. Two of the shows were secret shows, only available for friends and family and were held on the 18 and 25 May. The other two shows were held at Black Box Music in Berlin on the 26 and 28 May.

Setlist 
 "Ramm4"
 "Reise, Reise"
 "Halleluja"
 "Zerstören"
 "Keine Lust"
 "Feuer frei!"
 "Seemann"
 "Ich tu dir weh"
 "Du riechst so gut"
 "Mein Herz brennt"
 "Links 2-3-4"
 "Ich will"
 "Du hast"
 "Stripped"
Encore
 "Sonne"
 "Amerika"
 "Engel"

Note: During the first few dates of the tour, "Ohne dich" was played acoustically. Also on certain dates "Te quiero puta!", "Moskau" and "Frühling in Paris" were played. "Give Peace a Chance" and "Spieluhr" were also performed during the rehearsal concerts. This is also the first tour not to feature "Asche zu Asche" on the setlist of any concert.

Tour dates 

Cancelled dates

References

External links 
 Set lists from Rammstein's concerts

Rammstein concert tours
2016 concert tours